Season of Lights... Laura Nyro in Concert is the first live album by American singer-songwriter Laura Nyro.

Overview
Columbia Records issued the album in the summer of 1977, taking the songs from various locations on Nyro's 1976 tour in support of her most recent studio album, Smile. Although the album had no strict producer, Nyro is credited as the "musical director." Dale Ashby was engineer and mixer, assisted by Don Pulse and Ken Robertson.

The album documents Nyro's first full-band tour, with her playing guitar, piano, and other keyboards, backed by a group of musicians including John Tropea on guitar and Richard Davis on bass. The atmosphere of the album is laidback, smooth, and jazz-inspired, musically similar to the explorations on Smile. Nyro re-arranged many songs to fit her new band's sound, such as slowing down "Sweet Blindness" or making "And When I Die" funkier.

The album was originally intended to be a double-LP set consisting of 16 songs, and this version was sent to some outlets as a promotional copy and as a Japanese import. Instead, Columbia released a single-LP set of 10 songs. Reissue imprint Iconoclassic Records released a remastered version of Season of Lights, including all sixteen songs plus a bonus solo version of "Timer," on CD in August 2008.

The album peaked at #137 on the Billboard 200 chart, then known as the Pop Albums chart. It was Nyro's penultimate US chart entry after a run of seven successive charting albums stretching back to 1968's Eli and the Thirteenth Confession, before her final chart entry in 1984.

Track listing (standard single vinyl version) 
All tracks composed by Laura Nyro

Track listing (original double-vinyl version and Iconoclassic 2008 CD remaster)

Personnel
Laura Nyro – vocals, piano, musical director
John Tropea – electric guitar
Richard Davis – bass
Andy Newmark – drums
Carter "C.C." Collins – percussion
Nydia Mata – congas
Mike Mainieri – clavinet, marimba, vibraphone
Jean Fineberg, Jeff King – saxophone
Ellen Seeling – trumpet
Technical
Recorded by Dale Ashby
Mixed by Don Puluse and Ron Johnsen
Cover painting by Rokuro Taniuchi

References

 Allmusic
 Laura Nyro

Laura Nyro live albums
1977 live albums
Columbia Records live albums